The curvatures of  the stomach refer to the greater and lesser curvatures. The greater curvature of the stomach is four or five times as long as the lesser curvature.

Greater curvature  
The greater curvature of the stomach forms the lower left or lateral border of the stomach.

Surface
Starting from the cardiac orifice at the incisura cardiaca, it forms an arch backward, upward, and to the left; the highest point of the convexity is on a level with the sixth left costal cartilage.

From this level it may be followed downward and forward, with a slight convexity to the left as low as the cartilage of the ninth rib; it then turns to the right, to the end of the pylorus.

Directly opposite the incisura angularis of the lesser curvature the greater curvature presents a dilatation, which is the left extremity of the pyloric part; this dilatation is limited on the right by a slight groove, the sulcus intermedius, which is about 2.5 cm, from the duodenopyloric constriction.

The portion between the sulcus intermedius and the duodenopyloric constriction is termed the pyloric antrum.

At its commencement the greater curvature is covered by peritoneum continuous with that covering the front of the organ.

The left part of the curvature gives attachment to the gastrolienal ligament, while to its anterior portion are attached the two layers of the greater omentum, separated from each other by the gastroepiploic vessels.

Blood supply 
There are three arteries which primarily supply the greater curvature:

 short gastric arteries — upper part
and the gastroepiploic vessels:
 gastric branches of left gastro-omental artery — middle part
 gastric branches of right gastro-omental artery — lower part

Lesser curvature  
The lesser curvature of the stomach forms the upper right or medial border of the stomach.

Structure 
The lesser curvature of the stomach travels between the cardiac and pyloric orifices. It descends as a continuation of the right margin of the esophagus in front of the fibers of the right crus of the diaphragm, and then, turning to the right, it crosses the first lumbar vertebra and ends at the pylorus.

Nearer its pyloric than its cardiac end is a well-marked notch, the incisura angularis, which varies somewhat in position with the state of distension of the viscus; it serves to separate the stomach into a right and a left portion.

The lesser curvature gives attachment to the two layers of the hepatogastric ligament – part of the lesser omentum, and between these two layers are the left gastric artery and the right gastric branch of the hepatic artery.

Additional images

See also

External links

References

Stomach